Elkšņi Parish is an administrative unit of Jēkabpils Municipality in the Selonia region of Latvia. The administrative center is Elkšņi village.

Towns, villages and settlements of Elkšņi parish 
 Apserde
 Elkšņi
 Klauce

References

External links

Parishes of Latvia
Jēkabpils Municipality
Selonia